Lake Mattamuskeet Pump Station, also known as Mattamuskeet Lodge, is a historic pumping station building located on Lake Mattamuskeet at the Mattamuskeet National Wildlife Refuge near Swan Quarter, Hyde County, North Carolina.  It was built in 1911, and is a three-story 14,977 square foot brick building.   In 1934, it was remodeled as headquarters building and hotel accommodation for visitors after acquisition of Lake Mattamuskeet by the U. S. Government.  The building contains 38 rooms and is connected to a 120-foot-high tower with stairway.

It was listed on the National Register of Historic Places in 1980.

References

External links
 
 Mattamuskeet NWR, USFWS

Industrial buildings and structures on the National Register of Historic Places in North Carolina
Industrial buildings completed in 1911
Buildings and structures in Hyde County, North Carolina
National Register of Historic Places in Hyde County, North Carolina